Dream On is the sixteenth studio album by American keyboardist and record producer George Duke. It was released in 1982 through Epic Records. Recording sessions for the album took place at Le Gonks West Studio in West Hollywood, California, except for horns on "Positive Energy" and strings, which were recorded at Westlake Recording Studios and A&M Studios respectively. It was mastered by Brian Gardner at Allen Zentz Mastering in Hollywood.

The album peaked at #48 on the Billboard 200 and at #17 on the Top R&B/Hip-Hop Albums chart in the United States. It spawned four singles: "Shine On", "Ride On Love", "I Will Always Be Your Friend" and "Dream On". Its lead single, "Shine On", peaked at #41 on the Billboard Hot 100, making it Duke's third charted single after "Reach for It" (#54) from 1977 Reach for It and "Sweet Baby" (#19) from 1981 The Clarke/Duke Project. "Ride on Love" was a minor success, peaking at #83 on the Hot R&B/Hip-Hop Songs chart. "I Will Always Be Your Friend" and "Dream On" weren't charted.

Track listing

Personnel 
 George Duke – Fender Rhodes (1-10), acoustic piano (1, 4, 5, 6, 8, 9), Synare (1, 6),  Prophet-5 (2-10), vocals (2, 3, 4, 6, 7, 8, 10), finger snaps (2), string conductor (3, 4, 6, 10), melodion (4), clavinet (5, 6, 9), lead vocals (5), backing vocals (5), Minimoog (6, 8), ARP synthesizer (7), Oberheim synthesizer (7)
 Michael Sembello – guitar (1-4, 6, 9)
 Charles "Icarus" Johnson – guitar  (7)
 Byron Miller – bass (1-7, 9)
 Leon "Ndugu" Chancler – drums (1-10), vocals (7)
 Paulinho da Costa – percussion (2, 4, 9, 10)
 Larry Williams – tenor saxophone (1), saxophone (2)
 Gary Herbig – saxophone (9)
 Bill Reichenbach, Jr. – trombone (1, 2, 9)
 Gary Grant – trumpet (1, 2, 9), flugelhorn (2)
 Jerry Hey – trumpet (1, 2, 9), flugelhorn (2)
 Carl Caldwell – backing vocals (5)
 Jean Carn – vocals (7)
 Dee Hendricks – vocals (7)
 Flora Purim – vocals (7)
 Deborah Thomas – vocals (7)
 Sybil Thomas – vocals (7)

Strings (3, 4, 6, 10)
 Charles Veal, Jr. – concertmaster 
 Rosemary Veal – contractor 
 Julianna Buffum, Paula Hochhalter, Dennis Karmazyn, Nils Oliver and Danny Rothmuller – cello
 Denyse Buffum, Rollice Dale, Virginia Majenski and Barbara Thomason – viola 
 Arnold Belnick, Mari Botnick, Bonnie Douglas, Henry Ferber, Ron Folsom, Frank Foster, Endre Granat, Bob Sanov, Sheldon Sanov, Carol Shive, Paul Shure, Marcia Van Dyke, Dorothy Wade and Ken Yerke – violin

Production 
 George Duke – producer, arrangements 
 Erik Zobler – engineer (1, 2, 4, 6)
 Tommy Vicari – engineer (3, 5, 8, 9, 10)
 Kerry McNabb – recording (7)
 Jim Cassell – assistant engineer
 James "Chip" Orlando – assistant engineer
 Nick Spigell – assistant engineer
 Stewart Whitmore – assistant engineer
 Brent Averill – technician 
 Brian Gardner – mastering 
 Robert Duffy – cover concept, design 
 Randy Moses – cover concept
 Sam Emerson – photography

Chart history

References

External links 

1982 albums
George Duke albums
Epic Records albums
Albums produced by George Duke
Albums recorded at A&M Studios
Albums recorded at Westlake Recording Studios